The Christchurch Call to Action Summit (also called the Christchurch Call), was a political summit initiated by New Zealand Prime Minister Jacinda Ardern that took place on 15 May 2019 in Paris, France, two months after the Christchurch mosque shootings of 15 March 2019. Co-chaired by Ardern and President Emmanuel Macron of France, the summit aimed to "bring together countries and tech companies in an attempt to bring to an end the ability to use social media to organise and promote terrorism and violent extremism". World leaders and technology companies pledged to "eliminate terrorist and violent extremist content online"; 17  countries originally signed the non-binding agreement, with another 31 countries following suit on 24 September the same year. The pledge consists of three sections or commitments: one for governments, one for online service providers, and one for the ways in which the two can work together.

Signatories

Among the signatories to the pledge are the European Commission, Council of Europe, UNESCO, and the governments of the following countries:

  Argentina
  Australia
  Austria
  Belgium
  Bulgaria
  Canada
  Chile
  Colombia
 Croatia
  Cyprus
  Czech Republic
  Denmark
 Estonia
  Finland
  France
  Georgia
  Germany
  Ghana
  Greece
  Hungary
  Iceland
  Indonesia
  India
  Ireland
  Italy
  Ivory Coast
  Japan
  Jordan
  Kenya
  Republic of Korea
  Latvia
  Lithuania
  Luxembourg
  Maldives
  Malta
  Mexico
  Mongolia
  The Netherlands
  New Zealand
  Norway
 Peru
  Poland
  Portugal
  Romania
  Senegal
 Slovakia
  Slovenia
  Spain
  Sri Lanka
  Sweden
  Switzerland
 Tunisia
  United Kingdom
  United States

The following online service providers, as part of the Global Internet Forum to Counter Terrorism (GIFCT) consortium, also signed the pledge:

 Amazon
 Dailymotion
 Facebook
 Google
 Microsoft
 Qwant
 Twitter
 YouTube

The United States declined to attend in 2019, expressing concerns that US compliance with the agreement could create conflicts with free-speech protections in the country's Constitution; the United States however did support the summit's "overarching message" and "endorsed its overall goals". On 7 May 2021, White House press secretary Jen Psaki announced that the United States would be joining the Christchurch Call and participate in a virtual summit on 14 May 2021.

Commentary
Bryan Keogh wrote in The Conversation that the summit "has made excellent progress as a first step to change, but we need to take this opportunity to push for systemic change in what has been a serious, long-term problem." InternetNZ CEO Jordan Carter called the summit "a vital first step" to addressing terrorism and violent extremism online, saying that it was "important that governments and online service providers have come together on this issue, to agree real, actionable changes." Jillian York of the Electronic Frontier Foundation praised the Call for asking companies to provide greater transparency regarding its moderation practices, while expressing concerns about how terms such as "terrorism" and "violent extremism" are defined by various governments.

Tom Rogan argued in the Washington Examiner that the Call's goal for governments to work with companies to stop "violent extremist content" would breach Americans' First Amendment rights, using war footage on YouTube as an example of content that could be blocked under this agreement. Nick Gillespie of Reason criticized the summit, writing that "it should be deeply worrying to anyone who believes in free expression that governments and corporations are openly working together to decide what is and is not acceptable speech."

References

External links

2019 in Paris
2019 in international relations
21st-century diplomatic conferences
Christchurch mosque shootings
Counterterrorism
Internet censorship
May 2019 events in France
Social media
France–New Zealand relations
Conferences in Paris
Jacinda Ardern
Emmanuel Macron
2019 conferences